Earth Spirit (German: Erdgeist) is a 1923 German silent drama film directed by Leopold Jessner and starring Asta Nielsen, Albert Bassermann and Carl Ebert. It is based on the play of the same name by Frank Wedekind. It premiered in Berlin on 22 February 1923.

Plot
Dr. Schön marries a lower-class girl, Lulu. Young and voluptuous, she attracts the attention of all the men, but the doctor will not let her go. After Lulu shoots the doctor, his son has to make a serious decision.

Cast
 Asta Nielsen as Lulu 
 Albert Bassermann as Dr. Schoen 
 Carl Ebert as Schwarz 
 Gustav Rickelt as Dr. Goll 
 Rudolf Forster as Alwa Schoen 
 Alexander Granach as Schigolch 
 Heinrich George as Rodrigo 
 Erwin Biswanger as Eulenber 
 Julius Falkenstein   
 Lucy Kieselhausen   
 Anton Pointner

References

Bibliography
 Grange, William. Cultural Chronicle of the Weimar Republic. Scarecrow Press, 2008.

External links

1923 films
Films of the Weimar Republic
German silent feature films
German drama films
Films based on works by Frank Wedekind
Films directed by Leopold Jessner
1923 drama films
Films with screenplays by Carl Mayer
German black-and-white films
Silent drama films
1920s German films
1920s German-language films